is jidaigeki novel written by Jirō Osaragi in 1945. The novel deals with the warlord Gotō Matabei's life during the Warring States period. The novel was adapted into film in 1952 and 1964.

Plot
Gotō Matabei is the most able and fierce samurai of the Kuroda clan. However, he gradually dislikes the ruthless personality of Kuroda Nagamasa and leaves the clan. Seven years later, he joins Toyotomi Hideyori's army.

Adaptations

Kojiki Taishō 1952

A Daiei production in 1952, Directed by Sadatsugu Matsuda.
 Utaemon Ichikawa as Gotō Matabei
 Ryūnosuke Tsukigata as Kuroda Nagamasa
 Yoshiko Nakamura as Maihime
 Masahiko Sawamura as Hanawaka
 Hideo Fujino as Tokugawa Ieyasu
 Ryōsuke Kagawa as Fukushima Tamba
 Mitsusaburō Ramon as Utsunomiya Shigefusa

Kojiki Taishō 1964

A Daiei production in 1964, Directed by Tokuzō Tanaka and Music by Akira Ifukube.
 Shintarō Katsu as Gotō Matabei
 Tomisaburō Wakayama as Utsunomiya Shigefusa
 Jun Fujimaki as Kuroda Nagamasa
 Yukiko Fuji as Tsuruhime
 Nakajiro Tomita as Fukushima Masanori
 Shosaku Sugiyama as Honda Masanobu
 Ryuzo Shimada as Ikeda Terumasa
 Masakazu Tamura as Hanawaka
 Ryōsuke Kagawa as Fukushima Tamba
 Masao Shimizu as Tokugawa Ieyasu

References

External links
 

Fictional samurai
Japanese novels
Japanese historical novels
Japanese novels adapted into films
Films directed by Tokuzō Tanaka
Japanese war novels
1960s Japanese films